Ant-Man and the Wasp: Quantumania (Original Motion Picture Soundtrack) is the film score for the Marvel Studios film Ant-Man and the Wasp: Quantumania. The score was composed by Christophe Beck. Hollywood Records released the album digitally on February 15, 2023.

Background
Christophe Beck was revealed to be composing the score by July 2022, after previously working on the previous two Ant-Man films, as well as the MCU Disney+ series WandaVision and Hawkeye (both in 2021). The soundtrack album was released digitally by Hollywood Records and Marvel Music on February 15, 2023, with its first track, "Theme from Quantumania", released as a digital single on February 12.

Track listing
All music composed by Christophe Beck.

Additional music
Two additional songs were found in the film, "Welcome Back" by John Sebastian and "Il Capo" by Austin Filingo & John W Padgett

References

2023 soundtrack albums
2020s film soundtrack albums
Ant-Man (film series)
Marvel Cinematic Universe: Phase Five soundtracks